This is a list of the cast members of the science fiction/horror-themed children's television series, Are You Afraid of the Dark? The cast members are part of "The Midnight Society" during the series.

Are You Afraid of the Dark? (1990–1996) cast

Are You Afraid of the Dark? (1999–2000) cast

Are You Afraid of the Dark? (2019–2022) cast

Notes
  Daniel DeSanto (Tucker) is the only actor to be a main cast member in both the 1990–1996 and the 1999–2000 incarnations of Are You Afraid of the Dark?
  Ross Hull (Gary), who starred throughout the entire 1990–1996 run of the incarnation of Are You Afraid of the Dark? guest-starred in the three-part "The Tale of Silver Sight" episode of the 1999–2000 incarnation of the show.

References

Are You Afraid of the Dark?
Lists of actors by American television series